Spalding Grammar School (SGS), fully known as The Queen Elizabeth Royal Free Grammar School Spalding, is a boys' grammar school in Spalding, Lincolnshire, England.

History 
The school was founded in 1588 by royal charter, applied for by a Rev. Johnson, and within part of Spalding Parish Church, called St Thomas's Chapel, until the 19th century. It was founded on its current site in 1881.

The school amalgamated with Moulton Grammar School of Moulton in 1939. Moulton Grammar School was founded under the will of John Harrox (died 1561) who was steward to Sir John Harrington of Weston. The School opened in 1562 with ten pupils and continued to educate boys from the district until it amalgamated with Spalding. The old school buildings still exist but are now private residences.

The school magazine,  The Bentleian, dates to July 1922.

In October 2018 a decision was made by the school to stop sixth form pupils from using "ever-larger bags" to carry books, which were seen by the school as an injury danger to younger pupils. A temporary online petition was organised against the order.

Admissions 

In years 7 to 11, only boys are admitted. In sixth form (years 12 and 13), both boys and girls are admitted. Spalding Grammar is a selective school, and its entrants in the lower school are permitted only by taking the county-wide 11+ tests. The current number of pupils is 985. The sixth form has 277 pupils. There are 68 teaching staff.

School site
The school is in the south of Lincolnshire, on Priory Road in Spalding.

A sports hall was opened by boxer Henry Cooper in November 1993. In January 2006 new buildings were opened for ICT, sociology, technology, English and drama (with a performing arts studio). The Modern Languages lab was also built at the same time as the new buildings were opened. In late 2009, a new Business Studies block, new staff room and atrium were also built.

Awards and recognition 
In 2015 the school received an Ofsted rating of Grade 4 "Inadequate", following a previous rating of a Grade 3 "Requires Improvement" in 2011, and "Inadequate" in 2007. The school converted to academy status on 1 February 2013.

In 2006, the school was granted Specialist Status as a Languages and Engineering College. It became the first school in Lincolnshire to gain joint specialist status in these subjects. Accompanying the specialist status was building work to improve general aspects of the school, and to provide a Language Lab and Engineering Lab for the teaching of the subjects. The school converted to academy status on 1 February 2013.

Notable alumni

 Jack Hobbs - defender at Hull City A.F.C.
 Maurice Johnson (antiquary) (c.1700–5)
 William Hobson Mills, organic chemist who investigated stereochemistry and found the Mills-Nixon effect
 Stuart Storey (1954–61) - BBC sports commentator.
Will Wand - Rugby player at Coventry
Harrison Burrows - Midfielder at Peterborough United
Tre Jean-Marie, music producer

Moulton Grammar School
 Johnny Douglas (1895–7), Olympic gold medal winner in boxing and captain of the England Cricket Team
 Rt Rev Kenneth Healey, Bishop of Grimsby from 1958 to 1966
 Walter Plowright (1923–2010) veterinary scientist who devoted his career to the eradication of rinderpest

Former teachers 
 Richard Bentley - English theologian, classical scholar and critic - (Former Headmaster)
 Timothy Neve, churchman

See also 
 Spalding High School - mainly a school for girls, but accepts boys into the sixth form.

References

External links 
 Spalding Grammar School
 EduBase

Boys' schools in Lincolnshire
Grammar schools in Lincolnshire
1588 establishments in England
Educational institutions established in the 1580s
Spalding, Lincolnshire
Academies in Lincolnshire

Schools with a royal charter